Cecilia Rimstedt is a Swedish two-time world champion bridge player. Rimstedt comes from a Bridge playing family including her sister, Sandra Rimstedt and twin brothers Mikael Rimstedt and Ola Rimstedt.

Bridge accomplishments

Wins
 Venice Cup (1) 2019
 World Bridge Series Women Teams (1) 2022
 North American Bridge Championships (1)
 Smith Life Master Women's Pairs 2006

Runners-up
 Venice Cup (1) 2017

References

External links
 
 

Swedish contract bridge players
Living people
Year of birth missing (living people)